Emad Mohsin (born 3 November 1996 in Baghdad, Iraq) is an Iraqi footballer who plays as a centre forward for Al-Minaa.

Club career
Emad started his senior career at Al-Karkh where he spent two seasons with club, scoring seven goals. He signed for Al-Quwa Al-Jawiya for the 2015–2016 season, and continued until the 2018–2019 season, he left the team at the end of the season after winning five championships with them and scored 51 goals in all competitions.

Emad signed in 2019 for Al-Zawraa club, but he only played some matches, then he moved to professional with the Sudanese club Al-Hilal. He started his professional career in 2020, where he signed with the Sudanese club Al-Hilal, but he played only ten matches and scored one goal, and he ended his contract with the club and returned to Iraq due to problems with the team coach. On 27 July 2020, he signed for Basra Club Al-Minaa.

International career
On 28 February 2018 Emad played his debut with Iraq against Saudi Arabia in friendly match, scoring his first goal in this match which ended 4-1 for Iraq.

Iraq national team goals
Scores and results list Iraq's goal tally first.

Honors

Club
Al-Quwa Al-Jawiya
 AFC Cup: 2016 winner, 2017 winner, 2018 winner
 Iraq FA Cup: 2015–16 winners
 Iraqi Premier League: 16-17

References

External links

1996 births
Living people
Sportspeople from Baghdad
Iraqi footballers
Association football forwards
Iraq international footballers
Iraqi expatriate footballers
Al-Shorta SC players
Al-Karkh SC players
Al-Quwa Al-Jawiya players
Al-Zawraa SC players
Al-Hilal Club (Omdurman) players
Al-Mina'a SC players
Expatriate footballers in Sudan
Iraqi expatriate sportspeople in Sudan
AFC Cup winning players